Mitiarjuk Attasie Nappaaluk  (1931–2007) was a Canadian Inuk writer. She was most noted for Sanaaq, one of the first Inuktitut language novels; although written earlier, it was published later than Markoosie Patsauq's Harpoon of the Hunter.

Biography
Born in 1931 near Kangiqsujuaq, Quebec, her formal education did not begin until she was twenty. She began writing her novel Sanaaq in the early 1950s when an Oblate missionary in the area asked her to write some sentences in Inuktitut so he could learn the language. Written in Inuktitut syllabics, the novel was not published until 1984, but quickly became a cultural touchstone in Inuit communities throughout the Canadian Arctic. A French translation of the novel was published in 2002 and an English edition was published in 2014.

Nappaaluk also translated the Roman Catholic Book of Prayer into Inuktitut and wrote several books on traditional language and culture for use in Inuit schools. She served on Nunavik's Inuktitut Language Commission and was a consultant with the Kativik School Board. She was married to Naalak Nappaaluk, also a noted promoter of Inuit cultural traditions.

Awards and honours
She was named a Member of the Order of Canada in 2004. She also won a National Aboriginal Achievement Award, and received an honorary degree from McGill University.

References

1931 births
2007 deaths
20th-century Canadian novelists
Canadian women novelists
Members of the Order of Canada
People from Nunavik
Writers from Quebec
Canadian Inuit women
Inuit writers
Translators to Inuktitut
Indspire Awards
20th-century Canadian women writers
Inuit from Quebec
Canadian women non-fiction writers
20th-century Canadian translators